The World Affairs Council of Kentucky & Southern Indiana (WAC) is a non-profit member-based organization based in Louisville, Kentucky, whose mission is to "promote cross-cultural awareness, education and tolerance through nonpartisan discussions on current international issues". The Council is a member of the World Affairs Councils of America and Global Ties U.S. Network. 

For twenty years the organization was known as the Louisville International Cultural Center (LICC). In order to "highlight [their] role in bringing high-quality international programming to [the] area and to emphasize [its] role as the local chapter of the World Affairs Councils of America," the organization became the World Affairs Council of Kentucky and Southern Indiana in 2004.

The Muhammad Ali Center has partnered with the World Affairs Council of Kentucky and Southern Indiana since 2006. Similarly, the University of Kentucky Patterson School of Diplomacy and International Commerce maintains a close relationship with the World Affairs Council of Kentucky and Southern Indiana.

References

External links 
 
 http://www.courier-journal.com/story/life/wellness/health/2016/03/17/former-apple-ceo-better-health-through-tech/81776540/
 http://www.bizjournals.com/louisville/news/2016/03/22/former-apple-ceo-on-whats-driving-healthcare.html
 http://www.kentucky.com/sports/horses/article44034600.html
 http://insiderlouisville.com/tag/world-affairs-council-of-kentucky-and-southern-indiana/

 
Foreign relations of the United States
Non-profit organizations based in Louisville, Kentucky
Foreign policy and strategy think tanks in the United States
1984 establishments in Kentucky
Think tanks established in 1984